WAKO-FM (103.1 FM) is a radio station airing a mix of soft adult contemporary and adult contemporary formats. Licensed to Lawrenceville, Illinois, United States, the station is currently owned by David Crooks, through licensee DLC Media, and features programming from Westwood One Lite AC, CBS News Radio and Chicago Cubs Baseball.

The Lite 103 morning show features Arvin Hawkins as host and Steve Anderson, News Director, with News and Sports. The Operations Manager is Gil T. Wilson.

Notable former on-air staff 
 David Goodnow, 1959–1961

References

External links

AKO-FM
Soft adult contemporary radio stations in the United States
Mainstream adult contemporary radio stations in the United States